The Diocese of Ahiara is a Latin Church ecclesiastical territory or diocese of the Catholic Church located in Ahiara in the region of Mbaise in Imo State, Nigeria. It is a suffragan diocese in the ecclesiastical province of the metropolitan Archdiocese of Owerri.

History
 18 November 1987: Established as Diocese of Ahiara from the Diocese of Owerri

Appointment controversy 2012-2018
The clergy and laity of the diocese refused to accept the bishop Pope Benedict XVI had appointed in 2012 as their ordinary, Peter Ebere Okpaleke, because he was not of the Mbaise ethnic group or chosen from among the local priests. Okpaleke was consecrated a bishop on 21 May 2013, but he was not installed in Ahiara.

On 3 July 2013, Pope Francis appointed Cardinal John Onaiyekan, Archbishop of Abuja, as Apostolic Administrator.

On 8 June 2017, Pope Francis, after receiving a delegation from the Diocese, gave all the diocesan priests and deacons 30 days to personally write to the Vatican pledging obedience to the pope and accepting Okpaleke. Those who failed to write would be suspended a divinis, which would prohibit a priest or deacon from administering the sacraments, save for a priest hearing the confession of a person in danger of death, and would be removed from their posts. He had considered suppressing the diocese, but decided against that. On 8 July, it was reported that while the letter of apology was sent, Okpalaeke's appointment was still rejected by the local priests who insisted that the Holy See was enforcing racial discrimination in the country by hiring outsider priests to become bishops.

On 22 July 2017, Pope Francis agreed to respond through emissaries to the individual priests protesting Okpaleke's appointment.  

On 14 February 2018, Okpaleke submitted his resignation to Cardinal Fernando Filoni, Prefect of the Congregation for the Evangelisation of Peoples, and Archbishop Antonio Guido Filipazzi, Apostolic Nuncio to Nigeria. He wrote: "I do not think that my apostolate in a diocese where a group of priests and lay faithful are very ill disposed to have me in their midst would be effective." On 19 February 2018, Pope Francis accepted Okpaleke's resignation and on 5 March 2020 he appointed Okpaleke bishop of the newly created Diocese of Ekwulobia. Okpaleke was installed in that position on 29 April.

Special churches
The cathedral is Mater Ecclesiae Cathedral in the episcopal see of Ahiara.

Leadership
Bishops
 Victor Adibe Chikwe (18 November 1987 – 16 September 2010)
 Peter Okpaleke (7 December 2012 – 19 February 2018)
Apostolic Administrators 
 John Onaiyekan (3 July 2013 – 19 February 2018)
 Lucius Iwejuru Ugorji (19 February 2018 – present)

See also
Roman Catholicism in Nigeria

References

External links
 Official website of the Diocese of Ahiara
 GCatholic.org Information
 Catholic Hierarchy

Roman Catholic dioceses in Nigeria
Christian organizations established in 1987
Roman Catholic dioceses and prelatures established in the 20th century
Roman Catholic Ecclesiastical Province of Owerri